Philippe Chalumeau (born 8 November 1963) is a French politician of La République En Marche! (LREM) who has been a member of the French National Assembly since the 2017 elections, representing Indre-et-Loire's 1st constituency.

Political career
In parliament, Chalumeau serves on the Defense Committee, where he is his parliamentary group's coordinator. In addition to his committee assignments, he is a member of the French-Bolivian Parliamentary Friendship Group.

Political positions
In July 2019, Chalumeau voted in favor of the French ratification of the European Union’s Comprehensive Economic and Trade Agreement (CETA) with Canada.

References

Living people
Deputies of the 15th National Assembly of the French Fifth Republic
La République En Marche! politicians
1963 births